Albert Overton (August 29, 1903 – November 5, 1988) was an American Negro league pitcher in the 1930s and 1940s.

A native of Austin, Texas, Overton made his Negro leagues debut in 1932 with the Little Rock Grays. He went on to play for the Philadelphia Stars and Indianapolis–Cincinnati Clowns. Overton died in Galveston, Texas in 1988 at age 85.

References

External links
 and Seamheads

1903 births
1988 deaths
Indianapolis Clowns players
Little Rock Grays players
Philadelphia Stars players
Baseball pitchers
Baseball players from Austin, Texas
20th-century African-American sportspeople